Ziad Al-Zaza (28 November 1955 – 9 February 2022) was a Palestinian politician.

Biography
A member of Hamas, he served as Minister of Transportation with the Palestinian National Authority from 2006 to 2007 and was Minister of National Economy from 17 March to 14 June 2007. 

Al-Zaza died from COVID-19 in Gaza City on 9 February 2022, at the age of 66.

References

1955 births
2022 deaths
Hamas members
Palestinian politicians
Government ministers of the Palestinian National Authority
Deaths from the COVID-19 pandemic in the State of Palestine
People from Gaza City